South Bonnevoie is a quarter in south-eastern Luxembourg City, in southern Luxembourg.  Within the quarter lies most of the area of Bonnevoie, which also forms part of North Bonnevoie-Verlorenkost. 

, the quarter has a population of 12,657 inhabitants.

References

Quarters of Luxembourg City